The Man in the Picture: A Ghost Story, is a novel by English author Susan Hill, first published in 2007 by Profile Books. It has been featured as BBC Radio 4's Book at Bedtime.

Plot introduction
An oil painting of masked revellers at a Venetian carnival hangs in the room of Oliver's old professor in Cambridge, its story is revealed to Oliver one cold winter's night by the ageing don, the picture having the power to entrap and destroy those who cross its path.

References

External links
A masterclass in the art of dread review from The Independent
People keep appearing review from The Spectator
review from PopMatters

Novels by Susan Hill
2007 British novels
British horror novels
Ghost novels
Novels set in Cambridge
Profile Books books